Louis Gary Wilkins (December 10, 1882 – April 6, 1950) was an American athlete who competed mainly in the pole vault. He competed for the United States in the 1904 Summer Olympics held in St Louis, United States in the pole vault where he won the bronze medal.

References

1882 births
1950 deaths
American male pole vaulters
Olympic bronze medalists for the United States in track and field
Athletes (track and field) at the 1904 Summer Olympics
Medalists at the 1904 Summer Olympics